Elliott Graham Colvin (1836-1883) was a British Indian Civil Service (ICS) Officer. He served in Mathura and Meerut during the Indian Rebellion of 1857 and later became Meerut's Commissioner.  

After his death, a gate was erected in his memory in Bulandshahr on the instructions of Frederic Growse.

Early life and family
Elliott Colvin was born in 1836 in Calcutta, now Kolkata, to John Russell Colvin. His siblings included Auckland Colvin and Walter Colvin. He was educated at Eton and Haileybury, England. In 1850 he became a naval cadet.

On 18 September 1862 in Nainital, he married Edith, the eldest daughter of Peter Cunningham. The Times of India later noted that "he was peculiarly happy in his married life". He learnt French, German and Russian, and was familiar with several Northern Indian dialects.

Career
Colvin returned to India in 1855 and was an assistant in the Agra division at the onset of the Indian Rebellion of 1857, during which he served at Mathura. He fought at Hathras, Aligarh and the surrounding areas. He also became well known at Budaun. He spent a few months at Meerut before being appointed as superintendent of the Terai District towards Rohilkhand. In 1880 he was transferred to Benares. Later, he became settlement officer, collector and commissioner back at Meerut. There, he led the search for European graves and commissioned maintenance of the burial sites.

Death and legacy
At the age of 47, Colvin's health began to deteriorate. He died of "inflammation of the lungs" on 3 November 1883 at Sahanpur, and his body was taken to Meerut. He was buried at Meerut cemetery. At Meerut, he was succeeded by Mr. Quinton, a member of the Viceregal Council.

Following his death, a gate in his memory was constructed at a cost of 4,000 rupees at the east wall of Moti Bagh in Bulandshahr, Uttar Pradesh, at the instruction of Frederic Growse. Growse wrote in his 1884 book Bulandshahr; or, Sketches of an Indian district; social, historical and architectural that Colvin's "sudden untimely death, on the 3rd November 1883, was deeply felt by all classes of the community". An illustration of the gate was planned for inclusion in the second part of Growse's Indian Architecture of To-day as Exemplified in New Buildings in the Bulandshahr District.

Notes

References

1836 births
1883 deaths
19th-century British civil servants
Indian Civil Service (British India) officers
People educated at Eton College
People from Kolkata